The Electoral division of Newdegate was an electoral division in the Tasmanian Legislative Council of Australia. It existed from 1946, when the three-member seat of Hobart was split to create three single-member seats, to 1999, when it was abolished since the Council was reduced from 19 to 15 seats. It took its name from Francis Newdegate, a former Governor of Tasmania.

Members

See also
Tasmanian Legislative Council electoral divisions

References
Past election results for Newdegate

Former electoral districts of Tasmania
1999 disestablishments in Australia